List of student organizations in Bangladesh.
{| class="wikitable sortable"
|-
!Name of Organization
! class="unsortable" |Acronym
!Founded
!Website
!Headquarters
!General Secretary
!President

|-
|Islami Chhatra Andolan Bangladesh   
|ICAB 
| style="text-align:left;" |23 August 1991
|https://www.iscabd.org/
|Purana Paltan, 
Dhaka.

| style="text-align:left;" |Sheikh Muhammad Al-Amin.
| style="text-align:left;" |Nurul Karim Akram.
|-
| style="width:30%;" |Bangladesh Chhatra League
| style="text-align:left; width:7%;" |BSL
| style="text-align:left; width:5%;" |January 4, 1948
|www.bsl.org.bd
| Dhaka
| style="text-align:left;" |Lekhak Bhattacharya
| style="text-align:left;" |Al Nahian Khan Joy
|-
|Bangladesh Students' Union
| style="text-align:left;" |BSU
| style="text-align:left;" |April 26, 1952
|https://bsu1952.org.bd/
| Purana Paltan,
Dhaka-1000
| style="text-align:left;" |Anik Roy
| style="text-align:left;" |Mehedi Hasan Nobel
|-
|Bangladesh Islami Chhatra Shibir
| style="text-align:left;" |BICS
| style="text-align:left;" |February 6, 1977
|http://bangla.shibir.org.bd/
| Dhaka
| style="text-align:left;" |Hafez Rashedul Islam
| style="text-align:left;" |Salahuddin Ayubi
|-
|Bangladesh Jatiotabadi Chatra Dal
| style="text-align:left;" |JCD
| style="text-align:left;" |January 1, 1979
|
| Dhaka
| style="text-align:left;" |Iqbal Hossain Shyamal
| style="text-align:left;" |Fazlur Rahman Khokon
|-
|Bangladesh Islami Chhatrasena
|
| style="text-align:left;" |January 21, 1980
|
|Dhaka
| style="text-align:left;" |Muhammad Jaber
| style="text-align:left;" |Muhammad Joynul Abedin
|-
|Students Unity of Bangladesh [bn]
| style="text-align:left;" |SUB
| style="text-align:left;" |December 6, 1980
|http://studentsunitybd.com/
| style="text-align:left;" |22/1 Topkhana Road, Dhaka-1000
| style="text-align:left;" |Kazi Abdul Motaleb Jewel
| style="text-align:left;" |Faruk Ahmed Rubel
|-
|Biplobi Chhatro Moitry
| style="text-align:left;" |RSU
| style="text-align:left;" |December 6, 1980
|
| Dhaka
| style="text-align:left;" |Dilip Roy
| style="text-align:left;" |Iqbal Kabir
|-
|Socialist Students' Front
| style="text-align:left;" |SSF
| style="text-align:left;" |January 21, 1984
|https://spb.org.bd/mass-organizations/ssf
| Dhaka
| style="text-align:left;" |Nasir Uddin Prince
| style="text-align:left;" |Al Kaderi Joy
|-
| Students Federation of Bangladesh  [bn]
|SFB
| style="text-align:left;" |January 10, 1985
|https://www.studentfederationbd.org/
|Dhaka
| style="text-align:left;" |Saikat Arif
| style="text-align:left;" |Mashiur Rahman Khan Richard
|-
|Chhatra Gonomoncho
|
| style="text-align:left;" |January 25, 2012
|
|Dhaka
|
| style="text-align:left;" |Shantonu Sumon
|-
|Bangladesh Sadharon Chhatra Odhikar Songrokkhon Parishad
|BSRC
|February 17, 2018
|
|Dhaka
|Hasan Al Mamun
|
|-
|Islami Chhatra Mojlish
|
|
|
|Dhaka
| style="text-align:left;" |Khaled Saifullah
| style="text-align:left;" |Tarik Bin Habib
|
|Socialist Students' Unity
| style="text-align:left;" |SSF
| style="text-align:left;" |January 28, 2022
|
| Dhaka, Bangladesh
| style="text-align:left;" |Comarade Arup Mohajan
| style="text-align:left;" |jishan}

See also
 Bangladesh Awami League
 Bangladesh Jamaat-e-Islami
 Bangladesh Nationalist Party
 Socialist Party of Bangladesh
 Islami Andolan Bangladesh

References

Bangladeshi student movements

Student wings of political parties in Bangladesh